Tregarth railway station is a disused railway station in Gwynedd, Wales. It was located on the Bethesda Branch line, just north of the village of Tregarth itself.

History
The station was opened by the London and North Western Railway on 1 July 1884 as the terminal of the  Bethesda branch line.

The station was host to two LMS caravans from 1935 to 1939.

The station closed to passengers on 3 December 1951 and was totally closed on 7 October 1963. Since closure the station building has been demolished and only a short section of platform remains.

References

Further reading

External links

Disused railway stations in Gwynedd
Railway stations in Great Britain opened in 1884
Railway stations in Great Britain closed in 1963
Former London and North Western Railway stations